Sangre Grande is a region of Trinidad. The Region of Sangre Grande is a local government body and the largest Region of Trinidad and Tobago by area. The region has a land area of 898.94 km². The Sangre Grande Regional Corporation is headquartered in Sangre Grande.  Other urban areas within include Guaico, Toco and Valencia. For the Council Term of 2013–2016 the Sangre Grande Regional Corporation was expanded to include one additional Electoral District.

Demographics

Ancestry

References

 Local Government Corporations, from Nalis, the National Library and Information Service of Trinidad and Tobago.

Regions of Trinidad and Tobago
Sangre Grande
Trinidad (island)